is the first Japanese single by South Korean boy band 2AM. It was released on January 11, 2012, in three different editions.

The title track is the Japanese version of their Korean single "Can't Let You Go Even If I Die".

Track 2 in this album is a Japanese version of "I'm Sorry I Can't Laugh for You" which can be found on the Can't Let You Go Even If I Die EP.

Track listing

Limited edition Ver. B is also a CD only version + 32p booklet.

References

External links 
 Official Website
 Japanese Official Website

2012 singles
Japanese-language songs
2012 songs
Ariola Japan singles